Coptodera is a genus of beetles in the family Carabidae, constituted of 105 species distributed across North and South America, Africa, Oceania and eastern Asia.

They are small flattened beetles. The body size is usually under 11 mm and pronotum is generally wider than long. Many of them present patches or spots of different colours on the elytra.

A single fossil species of this genus has been described: Coptodera elektra, from Europe's Eocene, was described in 2015 from a single piece of Baltic amber.

It contains the following species:

 Coptodera acutipennis (Buquet, 1834) 
 Coptodera aeneorufa Bates, 1869 
 Coptodera aerata Dejean, 1825 
 Coptodera alluaudi (Jeannel, 1949) 
 Coptodera amoenula Boheman, 1848  
 Coptodera apicalis Shpeley & Ball, 1993 
 Coptodera aurata Chavrolat, 1835 
 Coptodera bifasciata Putzeys, 1845 
 Coptodera braziliensis Shpeley & Ball, 1993 
 Coptodera brunnea Shpeley & Ball, 1993 
 Coptodera catalai (Jeannel, 1949) 
 Coptodera cechovsky Kirschenhofer, 2010 
 Coptodera chalcites Bates, 1869 
 Coptodera championi Bates, 1883  
 Coptodera chaudoiri Andrewes, 1919
 Coptodera congoana Burgeon, 1937 
 Coptodera cupreotincta Bates, 1869 
 Coptodera dromioides (Bates, 1869) 
 Coptodera elongata Putzeys, 1845 
 Coptodera eluta Andrewes, 1923
 Coptodera emarginata Dejean, 1825  
 Coptodera erwini Shpeley & Ball, 1993 
 Coptodera esakii Nakane, 1956 
 Coptodera farai Jedlicka, 1963 
 Coptodera festiva Dejean, 1825 
 Coptodera flexuosa Schmidt-Gobel, 1846 
 Coptodera foveolata Shpeley & Ball, 1993 
 Coptodera fulminans (Bates, 1869) 
 Coptodera hova Alluaud, 1936 
 Coptodera immaculata (Mateu, 1970) 
 Coptodera interrupta Schmidt-Gobel, 1846 
 Coptodera japonica Bates, 1883 
 Coptodera lineata (Bates, 1883) 
 Coptodera marginata Dupuis, 1912 
 Coptodera megalops Bates, 1869 
 Coptodera nigrosignata (Reiche, 1843) 
 Coptodera nigroviridis Shpeley & Ball, 1993 
 Coptodera nitidula (Buquet, 1834) 
 Coptodera nobilis Jedlicka, 1963
 Coptodera osakana Nakane, Ohkura & Ueno, 1955
 Coptodera pakitza Shpeley & Ball, 1993 
 Coptodera picea Dejean, 1826 
 Coptodera poecila Bates, 1883 
 Coptodera proksi Jedlicka, 1963 
 Coptodera relucens Bates, 1869 
 Coptodera rufescens Buquet, 1835 
 Coptodera sahlbergi Chaudoir, 1869 
 Coptodera sallei Shpeley & Ball, 1993 
 Coptodera schaumi Chaudoir, 1861 
 Coptodera seyrigi Alluaud, 1936
 Coptodera sigillata Shpeley & Ball, 1993 
 Coptodera squiresi (Chaudoir, 1869) 
 Coptodera stockwelli Shpeley & Ball, 1993 
 Coptodera subapicalis Putzeys, 1877
 Coptodera subapicaloides Jedlicka, 1956 
 Coptodera taiwana Nakane, 1956 
 Coptodera teutonica Shpeley & Ball, 1993 
 Coptodera transversa (Reiche, 1843) 
 Coptodera tripartita Chaudoir, 1869 
 Coptodera tripunctata Shpeley & Ball, 1993 
 Coptodera undulata Perty, 1830 
 Coptodera versicolor Bates, 1869 
 Coptodera viridis Shpeley & Ball, 1993 
 Coptodera waytkowskii Liebke, 1951 
 Coptodera xanthopleura Bates, 1891

References

Lebiinae